Verbolten is a Zierer multi-launching steel roller coaster / haunted attraction at Busch Gardens Williamsburg in Williamsburg, Virginia. The concept was jointly designed by the park's creative design team and by Zierer of Germany. "Verbolten" is a play on words of the German word verboten, which translates to "forbidden" in English.

History
Busch Gardens Williamsburg announced a renovation to the Oktoberfest section in October 2010. This included a now defunct drop tower named Mäch Tower, which opened the year after. The remodel also included a new multi-launch coaster with first-of-its-kind elements. In May 2011, the coaster's layout was made public during a James City County, Virginia board meeting.

On September 17, 2011, Busch Gardens Williamsburg officially announced Verbolten, a family launched roller coaster with two launched sections and a building that houses special effects. The coaster was constructed on the former site of Big Bad Wolf. The track layout was completed in January 2012. Verbolten had a soft opening on May 11, 2012. A week later on May 18, the ride opened to the public.

Other coasters, such as Th13teen at Alton Towers  and Hagrid's Magical Creatures Motorbike Adventure at Islands of Adventure, also feature a vertical free-fall drop.

Theme
The ride was inspired by the Autobahn, the German highway system. As shown in the teaser video, a car takes a leisurely trip down the Autobahn, but suddenly lightning strikes the car and causes it to drive into the Black Forest, a "forbidden" forest in which the ride takes place. The dark forest encounters weather changes, such as lightning, as shown in the video.

The queue and station are themed as a motor tours agency owned and operated by the brother-and-sister team of Gerta and Gunter Schwartzwald. A portion of the queue is decorated as Gunter's office, which houses such curious items as plant samples, monitors, and the luggage of the unlucky tourists who have come before. The station house is themed as a garage where riders board trains that resemble stretched roadsters in one of five colors. The theme of the ride itself is the Black Forest and various legends associated with it.

The ride features an indoor portion (referred to as the "event" or "show building"), which represents a ride through the Black Forest and features one of three alternating special effects–driven story lines. The inside of the event building is decorated with painted drops and set pieces, as well as featuring unique sound and lighting effects, such as low whistles.

The ride features three randomized story lines inside the event building.
 The Spirit of the Forest: In this story, the effects feature a peaceful-sounding spirit who lures riders into the forest and then turns on them.
 Lightning Storm: In this story, the effects feature a violent storm that threatens to destroy the riders and their vehicle.
 The Big Bad Wolf: In this story, the effects feature a pair of glowing red eyes that stalk the train during its journey through the forest, a nod to the ride's predecessor.

The inclusion of multiple effects stories ensures that repeat riders will have a unique experience.

Layout

The train departs the station gently dipping to the left into a leisurely winding S-curve. Exiting the S-curve, the train enters the first linear synchronous motor launch, accelerating into the event building and cresting an airtime hill. This is followed by a dive into a series of high speed turns and a helix that guides the train onto a brake run, where a psychedelic visual of leaves with wind-blowing sounds are on display. The train then dives into a curve and up a medium-sized hill onto a second brake run, as it slowly comes to a stop. During this time, more psychedelic special effects are displayed, which vary depending on the theme's rotation that switches from ride to ride. After the train stops for a few moments on a pitch black section of track, magnets suspending the train release, quickly dropping riders  feet vertically while they remain facing horizontally. The train rests for a moment before the second LSM launch engages, accelerating the train out of the event building and through an 'S' turn up a hill. This leads to another brake run inside a short tunnel themed as a decaying covered bridge. As a recreation of the Big Bad Wolf's finale, the train then exits the tunnel and drops  into a hard left-hand turn along the river bank. A high speed S-curve follows, as the train traverses a bunny hop and a turnaround into the final brake run.

Tributes to Big Bad Wolf
Multiple nods to Verbolten's predecessor, the Big Bad Wolf, can be found throughout the ride and queue:
 One of the five trains, the orange train, reads "WOLF X ING" on its license plate.
 One of the three stories played within the event building features glowing red wolf eyes that chase riders through the forest.
 The final drop down to the riverbank as well as the turns that follow it copy the original coaster's drop towards the river and reuse the concrete footers.
 Many props in the waiting area include wolves.

Rankings 
Verbolten was ranked in the Amusement Today Golden Ticket Awards for best new ride of 2012 with 7% of the vote, to come in fourth place.

See also
 2012 in amusement parks
 Polar X-plorer, a ride at Legoland Billund with a similar ride system
 Th13teen, the first roller coaster to introduce this ride system

References

External links
 Official Construction Updates
 

Roller coasters in Virginia
Busch Gardens Williamsburg
Roller coasters operated by SeaWorld Parks & Entertainment
2012 establishments in Virginia